Knud Harder  (31 March 1885 – 1967) was a Danish composer.

See also
List of Danish composers

References
This article was initially translated from the Danish Wikipedia.

External links
 

Danish composers
Male composers
1885 births
1967 deaths
20th-century male musicians